Karbar or Karbar Station is a pastoral lease that currently operates as a cattle station and has previously operated as a sheep station.

The old townsite of Tuckanarra is situated within the station boundaries.

The property has numerous wells and bores at a shallow depth and the creek systems provide extensive floodout country that supports mulga shrubland and perennial grasses such as buffel. The maximum carrying capacity is approximately 8,050 sheep.

The homestead, which is the old Tuckanarra hotel, and shearers' quarters have been upgraded and offer tourist accommodation. The homestead has 15 rooms in total, including five bedrooms.

The station was established at some time prior to 1899 when it was placed on the market along with New Forrest Station. Improvements at the property included a six-room homestead, a woolshed, yards and fencing.

Ben Copley acquired the property in 1918.

James Hicks acquired the property in 1923 and had started running sheep and producing wool. Hicks died in 1944; the property was initially to be sold by the executors of Hicks' will but this was refused by the Supreme Court and Karbar was left to the Hicks' three children. The Hicks family still owned the property in 1952 and the property was still producing high quality wool attracting top prices. The Snell family acquired Karbar shortly afterwards.

Since acquiring Karbar the company has started to convert the property infrastructure to run cattle.

See also
List of ranches and stations

References

Pastoral leases in Western Australia
Stations (Australian agriculture)
Mid West (Western Australia)